Thomas L. Jennings  (January 1, 1791 – February 13,1856) was an African-American inventor, tradesman, entrepreneur, and abolitionist in New York City, New York.  He has the distinction of being the first African-American patent-holder in history; he was granted the patent in 1821 for his novel method of dry cleaning. Jennings' invention, along with his business expertise, yielded a significant personal fortune much of which he put into the Abolitionist movement in the United States.

Early life and family
Thomas L. Jennings was born on January 1, 1791, to a free African-American family in New York City. He later married a woman named Elizabeth, who was born a slave in Delaware, 1798 and died March 5, 1873. Under New York's gradual abolition law of 1799, she was converted to the status of an indentured servant and was not eligible for full emancipation until 1827. It freed slave children born after July 4, 1799, but only after they had served “apprenticeships” of twenty-eight years for men and twenty-five for women (far longer than traditional apprenticeships, designed to teach a young person a craft), thus compensating owners for the future loss of their property.

Jennings and his wife had three children: Matilda Jennings (b. 1824, d. 1886), Elizabeth Jennings (b. March 1827 d. June 5, 1901), and James E. Jennings (b. 1832 d. May 5, 1860). Matilda Jennings was a dressmaker and wife of James A. Thompson, a Mason. Elizabeth Jennings became a schoolteacher, activist, and church organist  and was the wife of Charles Graham, whom she married on June 18, 1860. James E. Jennings was a public school teacher and musician.

Professional career
Jennings was a tailor who later opened a dry cleaning business in New York City.  He eventually opened his own store on Church Street, which became one of the largest clothing stores in New York City.

Thomas developed his dry cleaning process called dry-scouring as a tailor. His customers often complained of their clothes being ruined by stains, so he started experimenting with different chemicals that could protect the fabric while removing stains. Thomas Jennings earned a large amount of money as a tailor and with his dry scouring invention made even more. Thomas spent the majority of his money on abolitionist activities. In 1831, Thomas Jennings became the assistant secretary for the First Annual Convention of the People of Color in Philadelphia, PA.

Civil rights activism and legacy 
Jennings was a leader for the cause of abolitionism and African-American civil rights in the United States.

In 1831, Jennings was selected as assistant secretary to the First Annual Convention of the People of Color in Philadelphia, Pennsylvania, which met in June of that year.

After his daughter, Elizabeth Jennings, was forcibly removed from a "whites only" New York City streetcar in 1854, he organized a movement against racial segregation in public transit in the city. He helped arrange her legal defense, which included the young future President Chester Arthur, and won her case in 1855.  Along with James McCune Smith and Rev. James W.C. Pennington, Jennings created the Legal Rights Association later in that year, a pioneering minority-rights organization. Its members organized additional challenges to discrimination and segregation, and gained legal representation to take cases to court. In 1865, a decade after Elizabeth Jennings won her case, New York City streetcar companies stopped practicing segregation.

He was active on issues related to emigration to other countries; opposing colonization in Africa, as proposed by the American Colonization Society; and supporting expansion of suffrage for African-American men.

He founded and was a trustee of the Abyssinian Baptist Church, a pillar in the Harlem African-American community.

References

Further reading
Alexander, Leslie M. African or American? Black Identity and Political Activism in New York City, 1784-1861, (Chicago: University of Illinois Press, 2008), chapters 3, 4, 5 and 6
Potter, Joan. African American Firsts (New York: Kensington Publishing Group, 2002)
Volk, Kyle G. (2014). Moral Minorities and the Making of American Democracy. New York: Oxford University Press. pp. 146–151. .

19th-century American inventors
African-American inventors
Pre-emancipation African-American history
1791 births
1856 deaths
African-American abolitionists